Emmeringer Leite is a mountain of Bavaria, Germany.

See also
List of mountains of Bavaria

References

Mountains of Bavaria